The Wittig reaction or Wittig olefination is a chemical reaction of an aldehyde or ketone with a triphenyl phosphonium ylide called a Wittig reagent.   Wittig reactions are most commonly used to convert aldehydes and ketones to alkenes. Most often, the Wittig reaction is used to introduce a methylene group using methylenetriphenylphosphorane (Ph3P=CH2). Using this reagent, even a sterically hindered ketone such as camphor can be converted to its methylene derivative.

Stereochemistry
For the reaction with aldehydes, the double bond geometry is readily predicted based on the nature of the ylide. With unstabilised ylides (R3 = alkyl) this results in (Z)-alkene product with moderate to high selectivity. With stabilized ylides (R3 = ester or ketone), the (E)-alkene is formed with high selectivity. The (E)/(Z) selectivity is often poor with semistabilized ylides (R3 = aryl).

To obtain the (E)-alkene for unstabilized ylides, the Schlosser modification of the Wittig reaction can be used. Alternatively, the Julia olefination and its variants also provide the (E)-alkene selectively. Ordinarily, the Horner–Wadsworth–Emmons reaction provides the (E)-enoate (α,β-unsaturated ester), just as the Wittig reaction does. To obtain the (Z)-enolate, the Still-Gennari modification of the Horner-Wadsworth-Emmons reaction can be used.

Reaction mechanism
Mechanistic studies have focused on unstabilized ylides, because the intermediates can be followed by NMR spectroscopy. The existence and interconversion of the betaine (3a and 3b) is  subject of ongoing research. For lithium-free Wittig reactions, studies support a concerted formation of the oxaphosphetane without intervention of a betaine.  In particular, phosphonium ylides 1 react with carbonyl compounds 2 via a [2+2] cycloaddition that is sometimes described as having [π2s+π2a] topology to directly form the oxaphosphetanes 4a and 4b. Under lithium-free conditions, the stereochemistry of the product 5 is due to the kinetically controlled addition of the ylide 1 to the carbonyl 2.  When lithium is present, there may be equilibration of the intermediates, possibly via betaine species 3a and 3b. Bruce E. Maryanoff and A. B. Reitz identified the issue about equilibration of Wittig intermediates and termed the process "stereochemical drift". For many years, the stereochemistry of the Wittig reaction, in terms of carbon-carbon bond formation, had been assumed to correspond directly with the Z/E stereochemistry of the alkene products. However, certain reactants do not follow this simple pattern. Lithium salts can also exert a profound effect on the stereochemical outcome.

Mechanisms differ for aliphatic and aromatic aldehydes and for aromatic and aliphatic phosphonium ylides. Evidence suggests that the Wittig reaction of unbranched aldehydes under lithium-salt-free conditions do not equilibrate and are therefore under kinetic reaction control. E. Vedejs has put forth a theory to explain the stereoselectivity of stabilized and unstabilized Wittig reactions.

Strong evidence indicated that under Li-free conditions, Wittig reactions involving unstabilized (R1= alkyl, H), semistabilized (R1 = aryl), and stabilized (R1 = EWG) Wittig reagents all proceed via a [2+2]/retro-[2+2] mechanism under kinetic control, with oxaphosphetane as the one and only intermediate.

Scope and limitations

Functional group tolerance
The Wittig reagents generally tolerate carbonyl compounds containing several kinds of functional groups such as OH, OR, aromatic nitro, epoxide, and ester groups.  Even C=O and nitrile groups can be present if conjugated with the ylide- these are the stabilised ylides mentioned above. Bis-ylides (containing two P=C bonds) have also been made and used successfully. There can be a problem with sterically hindered ketones, where the reaction may be slow and give poor yields, particularly with stabilized ylides, and in such cases the Horner–Wadsworth–Emmons (HWE) reaction (using phosphonate esters) is preferred. Another reported limitation is the often labile nature of aldehydes, which can oxidize, polymerize or decompose. In a so-called tandem oxidation-Wittig process the aldehyde is formed in situ by oxidation of the corresponding alcohol.

Stereochemistry
One limitation relates to the stereochemistry of the product. With simple ylides, the product is usually mainly the Z-isomer, although a lesser amount of the E-isomer is often formed also – this is particularly true when ketones are used. If the reaction is performed in dimethylformamide in the presence of lithium iodide or sodium iodide, the product is almost exclusively the Z-isomer. If the E-isomer is the desired product, the Schlosser modification may be used. With stabilised ylides the product is mainly the E-isomer, and this same isomer is also usual with the HWE reaction.

Schlosser modification

The main limitation of the traditional Wittig reaction is that the reaction proceeds mainly via the erythro betaine intermediate, which leads to the Z-alkene. The erythro betaine can be converted to the threo betaine using phenyllithium at low temperature. This modification affords the E-alkene.

Allylic alcohols can be prepared by reaction of the betaine ylide with a second aldehyde. For example:

Example
An example of its use is in the synthesis of leukotriene A methyl ester. The first step uses a stabilised ylide, where the carbonyl group is conjugated with the ylide preventing self condensation, although unexpectedly this gives mainly the cis product. The second Wittig reaction uses a non-stabilised Wittig reagent, and as expected this gives mainly the cis product.

History
The Wittig reaction was reported in 1954 by Georg Wittig and his coworker Ulrich Schöllkopf.  In part for this contribution, Wittig was awarded the Nobel Prize in Chemistry in 1979.

See also

 Corey–Chaykovsky reagent
 Horner–Wadsworth–Emmons reaction
 Julia olefination
 Peterson olefination
 Tebbe's reagent
 Organophosphorus chemistry
 Homologation reaction
 Kauffmann olefination
 Titanium–zinc methylenation

References

External links
Wittig reaction in Organic Syntheses, Coll. Vol. 10, p. 703 (2004); Vol. 75, p. 153 (1998). (Article)
Wittig reaction in Organic Syntheses, Coll. Vol. 5, p. 361 (1973); Vol. 45, p. 33 (1965). (Article)

Olefination reactions
Carbon-carbon bond forming reactions
Name reactions
German inventions
Homologation reactions
1954 in science
1954 in Germany